KVDI (99.3 FM) is a commercial radio station licensed to Huxley, Iowa and serving the Des Moines metropolitan area. The station broadcasts a Conservative Christian talk and teaching radio format from the VCY America network. 

The FM antenna array is an FMC-4A manufactured by Harris, located off NW 158th Street in Polk City, Iowa. KVDI broadcasts with an effective radiated power (ERP) of 5,300 watts.

History
In 1950, the station signed on as KFGQ-FM in Boone, Iowa. It was the FM counterpart to AM 1260 KFGQ (now KDLF). Both stations were owned by the Boone Biblical College. Because the AM station was a daytimer, required to sign off at sunset, the religious programming could be heard around the clock on KFBQ-FM. The transmitter and broadcast tower were originally located in southwest Boone, Iowa on West Park Avenue.

The call sign switched to KFFF-FM on February 1, 2005. The call letters switched again in 2010 to KTIA-FM.

Truth Broadcasting applied to move KTIA-FM's transmitter from Boone to Huxley and also change the city of license to Huxley. This move would represent a 15-mile relocation to the southeast and provide a better signal to the Des Moines area, thus adding 400,000 people into KTIA-FM's listening range. Truth had opposition from Saga Communications, which owns several Des Moines radio stations. Saga said the move would put KTIA-FM in the Des Moines and Ames media markets.

That resulted in the Federal Communications Commission (FCC) in serving Truth Broadcasting with a Deficiency Letter that gave the owners the opportunity to rebut Saga's assertion. Truth Broadcasting countered with its own petition asking that the Deficiency Letter be reviewed and reversed because the move could not hit the Des Moines market without being over 50% of the metro, while the Commission noted that at one site with a directional pattern, the signal could get into over 50% of the Ames area. As a result of this, the FCC denied Truth's request and Petition for reconsideration, thus canceling the application. After reconsidering the decision, the FCC reversed its previous ruling and granted the construction permit for KTIA-FM moving to Huxley. The station was issued its license to cover Huxley on July 6, 2015.

The move of the studios, transmitter and other broadcast oriented items was accomplished in May/June 2015.

In 2021, it was announced the station would be sold to VCY America for $825,000. On November 15, 2021, the sale to VCY America was consummated, with the change to the KVDI call sign on December 17, 2021.

References

External links

Mass media in Boone, Iowa
Radio stations established in 1950
VDI
VCY America stations